The Heaven Makers (1968) is a science fiction novel  by American writer Frank Herbert. It was originally serialized in Amazing Stories magazine in 1967.

Plot introduction 
The Heaven Makers is set on contemporary Earth with one difference: that we are being watched and manipulated by aliens for their viewing pleasure. The plot focuses on several humans whose lives are changed by the aliens, and an alien observer investigating the morality of these changes.

Reception
David Pringle rated The Heaven Makers one star out of four. Pringle added "the sex in the book is all male wish-fulfillment; the politics and science are childish".

References

External links 
 

1967 American novels
Novels by Frank Herbert
Works originally published in Amazing Stories
Novels first published in serial form
Avon (publisher) books